Königswalde is a municipality in the district of Erzgebirgskreis, in Saxony, Germany.

History 
From 1952 to 1990, Königswalde was part of the Bezirk Karl-Marx-Stadt of East Germany.

References

Sources

External links 
 

Erzgebirgskreis